Khpedzh is a rural locality (a selo) in Shimikhyusky Selsoviet, Kurakhsky District, Republic of Dagestan, Russia. The population was 244 as of 2010. There are 3 streets.

Geography 
Khpedzh is located 7 km northwest of Kurakh (the district's administrative centre) by road, on the Khpedzhchay River. Kurakh and Khyurekhyur are the nearest rural localities.

Nationalities 
Lezgins live there.

References 

Rural localities in Kurakhsky District